is a Japanese long distance runner. She competed in the women's marathon at the 2017 World Championships in Athletics.

References

External links
 
 Yuka Ando at Wacoal 

1994 births
Living people
Japanese female long-distance runners
Japanese female marathon runners
World Athletics Championships athletes for Japan
Place of birth missing (living people)
Athletes (track and field) at the 2020 Summer Olympics
Olympic athletes of Japan
21st-century Japanese women